Bartolomé Camacho Zambrano (1510, Villafranca de los Barros, Extremadura, Castile - after 1583, Tunja, New Kingdom of Granada) was a Spanish conquistador who took part in the expedition of the Spanish conquest of the Muisca led by Gonzalo Jiménez de Quesada. He accompanied Gonzalo Suárez Rendón in the foundation of Tunja on August 6, 1539 and settled in the city. In 1583, Bartolomé Camacho Zambrano was mayor of Tunja together with Francisco de Avendaño.

Biography 
Bartolomé Camacho Zambrano was born in 1510 in the Extremaduran village Villafranca de los Barros with parents Juan Martin Camacho Savidos and Elvira Gonzáles Zambrana. He had a brother named Juan Martin Camacho Sabidos. Camacho Zambrano married Isabel Pérez de Cuéllar and the couple had seven children; two sons and five daughters. Isabel's sister Elvira married fellow conquistador Pedro Ruíz Corredor.

See also 

List of conquistadors in Colombia
Spanish conquest of the Muisca
El Dorado
Tunja, Hernán Pérez de Quesada
Gonzalo Jiménez de Quesada, Gonzalo Suárez Rendón

References

Bibliography

Further reading 
 
 
 
 
 
 
 
 

1510 births
Year of death unknown
16th-century Spanish people
16th-century explorers
Spanish conquistadors
Extremaduran conquistadors
History of the Muisca
History of Colombia
Tunja